Grégoire Jacq (born 9 November 1992) is a French tennis player.

Jacq has a career high ATP singles ranking of World No. 332 achieved on 29 October 2018. He also has a career high ATP doubles ranking of World No. 210 achieved on 14 August 2017.

Jacq made his ATP main draw debut at the 2017 French Open after receiving a wildcard to the doubles main draw with Hugo Nys. They were defeated by Jan-Lennard Struff and Mischa Zverev in the first round.

ATP Challenger and ITF Futures finals

Singles: 13 (5–8)

References

External links
 
 

1992 births
Living people
French male tennis players
Sportspeople from Clermont-Ferrand
20th-century French people
21st-century French people